, also , is a Japanese Shinto goddess venerated as  (also known as ) at Shirayama Hime Shrine in Hakusan, Ishikawa Prefecture. She is mentioned in Nihongi (Nihon Shoki), but not in Kojiki. She is also venerated at Yasukuni Shrine in Tokyo and at Yōrō Shrine in Gifu Prefecture. Kukuri appears very briefly during the myth of Yomi, after Izanagi used the great god Michikaeshi Ōkami to block the entry to Yomi no kuni. Her words are praised by Izanagi, but what she said to him was not recorded (or erased), which is strange, since Kukurihime is worshipped in 3,000 shrines across Japan, and was later merged with Kannon Bosatsu.

References

External links 
Kukurihime from Encyclopedia of Shinto

Japanese goddesses
Shinto kami
Mountain goddesses